Phoenicaulis is a monotypic genus of flowering plants in the family Brassicaceae found in western North America. It contains the single species Phoenicaulis cheiranthoides, which is known by the common names daggerpod and wallflower phoenicaulis. The genus name means 'reddish-purple stems', probably in reference to the tendency for the stems to take on such a color, and the species name means 'hand of flowers'.

Description
The basal leaves are narrowly lance-shaped to teardrop-shaped, up to 10 cm long, and woolly in texture. Leaves higher on the stem are shorter and usually less hairy. The inflorescence is a raceme of flowers with purple or pink petals up to about 1.5 cm long. The fruits are narrow, hairless siliques up to 9 cm long, and stick out from the stem on pedicels.

Range and Habitat
The plant grows in many types of habitat, especially rocky areas. It occurs in sagebrush scrub, scree, exposed volcanic and clay slopes, rock outcrops, hills, banks, and meadows. In the southern part of its range it also grows in the alpine climate of high mountains. It grows at up to 3200 meters in elevation and flowers early in spring.

References

External links

Phoenicaulis cheiranthoides. USDA PLANTS.
Phoenicaulis cheiranthoides. CalPhotos.

Brassicaceae
Flora of California
Flora of Idaho
Flora of Nevada
Flora of Oregon
Flora of Washington (state)
Flora of the Great Basin
Monotypic Brassicaceae genera